808s & Dark Grapes III is the second studio album by American hip hop duo Main Attrakionz. It was released on Vapor Records on June 30, 2015. It is the third installment of the duo's 808s & Dark Grapes series. Entirely produced by Friendzone, it features guest appearances from Shady Blaze, Robbie Rob, Dope G, and Lo Da Kid.

Critical reception

At Metacritic, which assigns a weighted average score out of 100 to reviews from mainstream critics, 808s & Dark Grapes III received an average score of 77, based on 4 reviews, indicating "generally favorable reviews".

Paul Simpson of AllMusic gave the album 3.5 stars out of 5 and called it "an enjoyable, highly focused effort." Calum Slingerland of Exclaim! gave the album an 8 out of 10, saying, "While the two have never been lauded as top-tier lyricists, their liberal approach to flow and delivery keeps their work engaging". Meaghan Garvey of Pitchfork gave the album a 7.4 out of 10, describing it as "bombastic and baroque, certainly not lo-fi".

SF Weekly placed the album at number 4 on the "Top 7 Bay Area Hip-Hop Albums of 2015" list. The album was also included on Cokemachineglows "Unison / Harmony 2015" list.

Track listing

References

External links
 

2015 albums
Main Attrakionz albums
Vapor Records albums